Elías Muñoz Ríos (born 3 November 1941) is a Mexican former professional football forward who played for Mexico in the 1966 FIFA World Cup. He also played for Tigres UANL.

References

External links
FIFA profile

1941 births
Mexican footballers
Mexico international footballers
Association football forwards
Tigres UANL footballers
1966 FIFA World Cup players
Liga MX players
Living people
Footballers at the 1968 Summer Olympics
Olympic footballers of Mexico